Miika Johannes Koppinen (born 5 July 1978) is a Finnish football coach and former player who is currently assistant coach at Finnsnes IL. Koppinen played professional football as a central defender from 1998 to 2014. He started his career in Finland before moving to Norway to play for Tromsø IL and Rosenborg BK. Koppinen won 18 caps for the Finland national football team and made 337 appearances for Tromsø, the third-highest number of appearances by any player for the club.

Club career

Early years
He first played youth football for KPS (Kokkolan Palloseura) before moving on to KPV in his home town of Kokkola. He made his debut for KPV in 1998 at 16 years of age, before moving to second division side FF Jaro in 1999. The club managed to reach the final of the Suomen Cup, before losing 2–1 to FC Jokerit.

Move to Norway
He joined Norwegian side Tromsø in 2000. Tromsø got fourth place in his first season, but a disappointing second season saw Tromsø relegated to the Norwegian first division. Tromsø responded quickly though and got back to the top-flight after one season. Two more seasons followed at Tromsø before securing a move to Rosenborg on a free transfer.

Rosenborg
At his first season at Rosenborg, Koppinen found himself injured for much of the season which limited his Premier Division appearances to only six games. He got himself back at the end of the season, also playing for his side during the group stages of the Champions League. A disappointing season saw Rosenborg in seventh place, the worst league position for decades.

In 2006 Koppinen helped Rosenborg win the Premier League, playing sixteen games. In the penultimate match of the 2006 Norwegian Premier League, Koppinen notably set up Rosenborg's deciding third goal against Viking by grabbing Viking's goalkeeper Mattias Asper's elbow, causing him to drop the ball.  At the time, it seemed likely that the goal would lead to relegation for Viking. In post-match interviews, Koppinen initially denied any wrongdoing, but two days later he called Viking's director Egil Østenstad and asked for forgiveness, citing it was the Rosenborg way and he did not like it. Because of this, he is regarded as an unfair player and his name is associated with lack of sportsmanship in the same way Quisling is with treason.

The following season in 2007 was yet another difficult season for his side, which resulted in only a fifth-place finish. On 18 September 2007 he scored for Rosenborg in a Champions League game at Stamford Bridge in a shock 1–1 draw against Chelsea F.C. This proved to be the last game during José Mourinho's Chelsea reign.

Return to Tromsø
In 2008, he moved back to Tromsø IL, and became vice-captain and later club captain. Koppinen helped his side to third places in the league in 2008 and 2010, and a second place in 2011. After suffering relegation in 2013, his last season helped the club win promotion before he at the end of the 2014 season retired as a player. Koppinen stated that the decision to retire was taken due to medical reasons hampering his ability to train and perform.

International career
He has played eight times for the Finnish U21 team. In 2000, he made his debut for the full national side in a game against Norway.

He played a total of eighteen games for Finland before stepping down in 2006, citing personal reasons. However four years later, in October 2010, he was called back to the national team to play a UEFA Euro 2012 qualifying match against Hungary, but in the end he did not belong to the final squad because of an injury.

Coaching career
In January 2015 Koppinen joined Finnsnes IL as assistant coach to Bjørn Johansen, a former teammate from Tromsø.

Personal life
He is married to a woman from Tromsø and has two children. He is fluent in Norwegian.

Honours

Club
Rosenborg
Tippeligaen: 2006

International career statistics

References

External links
  
 
 
 

1978 births
Living people
Finnish footballers
Finnish expatriate footballers
Finland international footballers
Rosenborg BK players
Tromsø IL players
FF Jaro players
Kokkolan Palloveikot players
Eliteserien players
Finnish expatriate sportspeople in Norway
Expatriate footballers in Norway
Association football defenders
People from Kokkola
Sportspeople from Central Ostrobothnia